The 1928 Utah Utes football team represented the University of Utah as a member of the Rocky Mountain Conference (RMC) during the 1928 college football season. Led by fourth-year head coach Ike Armstrong, the Utes compiled an overall record of 5–0–2 with a mark of 4–0–1 in conference playing, winning the first of six consecutive RMC titles.

Schedule

References

Utah
Utah Utes football seasons
Rocky Mountain Athletic Conference football champion seasons
College football undefeated seasons
Utah Utes football